Feistiellaceae is a family of freshwater green algae in the order Charales.

Genera
, AlgaeBase and Fossilworks accepted three genera:
†Amblyochara Grambast – 6 species
†Feistiella Schudack – 8 species
Nitellopsis Hy – 24 species

With this circumscription, the family as a whole is not extinct, since Nitellopsis contains living (extant) species, including the widely dispersed Nitellopsis obtusa. Other sources place Nitellopsis in the family Characeae, leaving Feistiellaceae with only extinct genera.

References

Charophyta
Green algae families